Notable people with surname Nussbaumer, or Nußbaumer, include:

Bob Nussbaumer (1924–1997), American football halfback
Daniel Nussbaumer (born 1999), Austrian football player
Henri Nussbaumer (born 1931), French engineer
Horst Nußbaumer (born 1971), Austrian rower
Ingo Nussbaumer (born 1956), Austrian artist and researcher
Jamie Nussbaumer (born 1987), cricketer
Lars Nussbaumer (born 2001), Austrian footballer
Luke Nussbaumer (born 1989), professional cricketer